Okaya Optical Co., Ltd. (岡谷光学機械株式会社; Okaya Kōgaku Kikai Kabushiki Gaisha) was the manufacturer in the 1950s of "Lord" cameras, "Vista" binoculars, and other  optical products.

Defunct companies of Japan
Photography companies of Japan